Tanke is a community in the city of Ilorin, which is the capital of Kwara State, Nigeria.

Tanke is located at Ilorin South. It is a residential area off the University Road, in the city of Ilorin. The community is a settlement which is mostly occupied by students of the University of Ilorin. The area houses places such the Tanke Market, Tanke Reservoir, Royal FM. Kaynet street in Tanke ilorin after visiting Avenue.

Oke Odo Market 

Oke-Ode Market is located off campus of University of Ìlọrin, a few kilometer to the University Gate. It is not a popular market in the city of Ìlọrin due to its seasonal patronage, but often, it is a major market for residents. The Oke-Ode community in Ìlọrin South is populated with students of the aforementioned institution.

Petty traders are few in numbers and they majorly trade on Tomatoes, Peppers, Vegetables, Onions, Garri and other grain farm produce.

References

Ilorin